Miomantis tangana is a species of praying mantis in the family Miomantidae, native to Africa.

See also
Mantodea of Africa
List of mantis genera and species

References

T
Mantodea of Africa
Insects of Tanzania